Asperoteuthis lui is a chiroteuthid squid of the genus Asperoteuthis. This species was discovered from the stomach contents of a ling, a species of fish. The damaged specimen did not include a funnel or a mantle, but had multiple arms, one tentacle, and eyes. It was initially identified as a species of giant squid of the genus Architeuthis.

References

Squid
Molluscs described in 1999